21st Bengal Native Infantry can refer to the 

1st Battalion, 21st Bengal Native Infantry which became the 1st Brahmans
2nd Battalion, 21st Bengal Native Infantry which became the 5th Light Infantry